The Pendennis Club is a private social club located at 218 West Muhammad Ali Blvd. (formerly Walnut Street) in Louisville, Kentucky.  It originated as a gentlemen's "city" club on the model of the clubs in London, Britain, of which White's Club founded in 1693 is the progenitor.  The Pendennis Club has long been regarded as the preeminent social club in Kentucky and one of the premier clubs in the United States.

Founding

The Pendennis Club was founded by Thomas Wilson Todd (1852-1892), Levi Bloom (1854-1944), John Smith Noyes (1842-1922), and William Whits Hite (1854-1908) who, with sixteen others, hosted a preliminary meeting for starting the club in Mr. Todd's office in Louisville City Hall on June 28, 1881.

Two organizational meetings, on July 9 & August 10, 1881, took place in the club's first home consisting of rented space over A. J. Ross's Grocery Store, located in a building at the southwest corner of 4th and Walnut Streets–which is the site of the present Seelbach Hotel (built 1905).  The Club's first president Maj. John Montgomery Wright (1841-1915) was elected at the latter meeting.  He was a graduate of West Point, a Union veteran of the Civil War, and later served as Clerk of the United States Supreme Court.

Also at that meeting, the members adopted a proposal to name the club for the fictional Arthur Pendennis, who was seen as a paradigm club man, from William Makepeace Thackeray's History of Pendennis:  His Fortunes and Misfortunes, His Friends and His Greatest Enemy (published 1850).  Arthur Pendennis's crest, which was described but not depicted in this novel, and the motto nec tenui penna (meaning "with unfailing wings") were adopted for the club as well.  By year's end, the crest had been rendered and was placed on bottles of Kentucky Bourbon sold to the Club's members.

Original Clubhouse 1883-1928 

Levi Bloom stated that the Club "grew like topsy," and many of Louisville's leading citizens joined from the start.  In 1883, the Club purchased its first permanent home–the residence of William Burke Belknap (1811-1889), founder of Belknap Hardware & Mfg. Co., located at 332 West Walnut Street.

The new clubhouse opened to members on August 1, 1883.  On that same day, the Southern Exposition was also opened in Louisville by U.S. President Chester A. Arthur.  That evening, President Arthur was a guest at the Pendennis Club where he and some of his cabinet members, including Robert Todd Lincoln, enjoyed a lavish dinner.  Other U.S. Presidents who have visited the Club include Theodore Roosevelt, William H. Taft, and Woodrow Wilson.

According to Levi Bloom, President Taft, who was a native of Cincinnati, "felt more at home and would rather come to the Pendennis Club than any other in the country."  Perhaps one reason why he was so fond of the Club is the following assessment of its members by later Pulitzer Prize winning journalist Arthur Krock:  If the term "gentleman" is held to its proper definition to mean a civilized, educated, well-mannered man, then no club in the United States numbered more such persons proportionate to its size than the Pendennis.Another notable early visitor was famed landscape architect (and designer of New York City's Central Park) Frederick Law Olmsted.  On May 20, 1891, he met for dinner at the Club with leading Louisville citizens and Park Commissioners during his visit to the city in which he proposed his plan for the city's park system.  Club member and Park Commissioner Andrew Cowan was instrumental in making this project a reality.In 1895, Charles Spencer-Churchill, 9th Duke of Marlborough visited the Club.  That same year, Alexander Lewis composed the Pendennis 2-Step.In 1884, there came to the Club the first of several staff members who would become true legends–Henry T. Bain (1863-1928).  Starting as the "elevator boy," it was not long before he became, perhaps, the first Maitre d' in the club's history, and his outstanding character made him a true legend.  As Club member and Louisville Courier-Journal publisher Barry Bingham, Sr. later explained,it could not have been long before the members noticed his dignity, his perfect manners, and his remarkable memory for names.  It was a later tradition that Henry knew every man and woman in "Louisville society," and that he was familiar with their pedigrees as well. ... He retired in 1924 and died just months before the opening of the new clubhouse in 1928, in which he was to have played a major part.

His legacy, though, lives on in the superlative sauce for meat that he created at the Club–known as Henry Bain's Sauce.  He sold the recipe to the Club, and the Club holds the trademark to it.  His sauce is not only still enjoyed by the Club's members, but it has also now been made available to the public in various local retail stores.

A reputed nephew of Henry Bain, Roland Hayes (1887-1977), made his 1910 debut at the Club as a classical lyric tenor.

The Old Fashioned Whisky Cocktail

It has long been claimed that the Old Fashioned Whisky Cocktail was invented at the Pendennis Club.  Some have disputed this claim noting that the term "old fashioned" was in use for cocktails before the Club was founded.  The term came into use for those who wanted the simple original cocktail–liquor with bitters, sugar and water–rather than more elaborate versions that had come into being by the mid-19th century.  This term's use as an adjective, though, is completely distinguishable from the specific drink of this name traditionally created by a bartender at the Club.

The earliest known published source attributing the drink's creation to the Club, has no ties to Kentucky:  Maryland native Albert Stevens Crockett stated in his Old Waldorf Bar Days in 1931 that the Old Fashioned Cocktail was "said to have been the invention of a bartender" at the Pendennis Club and that this drink was brought to New York City's original Waldorf-Astoria Hotel by or in honor of Club member and Bourbon distiller Col. James E. Pepper (1850-1906).  Club records confirm that Col. Pepper, a Lexington, Kentucky resident, became a member in 1893, and Club oral tradition among bartenders back to Craig Talley, who started at the Club in 1911, confirmed Col. Pepper's role in introducing the Old Fashioned in New York City.

In 1895, George J. Kappeler, with no known Kentucky ties, published Modern American Drinks containing, on the same page, not only a recipe for the "Whiskey Cocktail" but also one for the "Old-Fashioned Whiskey Cocktail."  The recipe given by Mr. Kappeler for the latter is substantively identical to that given in Crockett's book.  This source documents that the Old Fashioned was a specific separate drink by this point, and this time-line is consistent with Col. Pepper's known travels to New York City.

As for the identity of the bartender who created this drink, there are at least three possibilities.  The first is Jacques Straub (1865-1920) who came to the Club by 1889 as kitchen help and later became the Club's manager.  A native of Switzerland, Straub was a wine and spirits expert.  After moving to Chicago in 1909 to become the wine steward of the Blackstone Hotel, he published Straub's Manuel of Mixed Drinks in 1913 with an Old Fashioned recipe.  His recipe, like Kappeler's and Crockett's, did not call for the use of bourbon–which one might expect for a whiskey cocktail hailing from Kentucky.  Quite probably, the recipe was adapted for the tastes of Straub's new home, as it perhaps had also been for New York, where bourbon was not then plentiful or favored.

The other known candidate, Tom Bullock (1872-1964), was a Louisville native who went to work at the club as a bartender in about 1892 and, by 1917, had become the head bartender at the St. Louis Country Club.  While there, he published The Ideal Bartender in 1917 with an Old Fashioned recipe that calls for bourbon.  Bullock's prowess as a bartender is attested in a glowing introduction by George Herbert Walker–ancestor to U.S. Presidents George H. W. Bush and George W. Bush.

A third possible candidate is identified in the 1969 edition of  George Leonard Harter's Bull Cook and Authentic Historical Recipes and Practices as Thomas Louis Whitcomb, who it says invented the cocktail at the Club in 1889.  No records have been found documenting this individual's existence, much less association with the Club at the time.

The recipe for the Old Fashioned in use at the Pendennis Club includes the basic cocktail components including sugar & water (simple syrup) and bitters - but with the Angostura brand required.  In addition, fine Bourbon whisky is required and, also are one or more fruits:  the recipe used at the Club since at least the 1930s calls for the use of an orange slice, cherry, and a lemon twist with the former two muddled in the simple syrup.

One or more bartenders at the Pendennis Club have undisputedly created several other libations.  The Pendennis Toddy was included in Straub's Manual.  The recipe for the Pendennis Club Cocktail of then Club head bartender Martin Cuneo was published in the July 1934 edition of Esquire magazine.  In a 2015 article in Saveur, bartender Toby Cecchini described that "the Pendennis Club Cocktail has a mesmerizing balance of flavors:  sweet, tart, and packed with spice and strength all at the same time."  Finally, Pendennis Champagne Punch has been enjoyed by generations of Club members.

Prohibition did not hinder the enjoyment by some of the Club's members of their libations.  On August 9, 1930, the Club was raided, and six car-loads of the very best beverages were taken away.  One agent commented:  "I never saw so many kinds of drinks in my life."

New clubhouse

The Pendennis Club constructed its current clubhouse, about a block east from the location of the original, in 1927-1928.  This notable Georgian Revival building with nearly 80,000 square feet under roof was designed by the Louisville firm of Nevin, Wischmeyer & Morgan.  Architect Frederick L. Morgan contributed all the designs for the exterior and interior additions and renovations.  Local contractor Wortham Construction oversaw construction.

Mr. Nevin commented at the time that the new $1 million structure was designed to be "one of the finest club buildings in the country," and he emphasized to a newspaper reporter "that the very best material and equipment will go into the structure."  The building remains one of the finest clubhouses in the United States and not only includes a large variety of Georgian architectural details but also includes two rooms with the famed French woodblock printed wallpaper by Zuber & Cie.  It opened to the members on December 11, 1928.

An interesting photograph of the Club's magnificent walnut-paneled library was featured in the March 27, 1948 edition of New Yorker Magazine showing the room with its commodious library tables, its generously proportioned red leather chairs and sofas, and shelves of classic books rising up to the plaster-work ceiling:  the room looks very much the same today and has changed little in the more than seven decades since this publication.

The facade of the clubhouse was placed on the National Register of Historic Places in 2003.  Today, the Club's walnut-paneled billiard room with teak wood floor is one of the few surviving grand billiard rooms in the United States still in use for its original purpose.  The racquet sport of Squash was first introduced in Louisville at the Pendennis Club in 1930, when the first of two handball courts was converted to Squash.

Notable Events

The Pendennis Club has been the venue for numerous debutante presentations and parties along with other major social events of the year.

Periodically since at least 1941, the Pendennis Club has hosted a stag boxing night–with a boxing ring set up in the Club's grand Georgian ballroom.  On February 19, 1960, then Cassius Clay (Muhammad Ali) participated in this event, in which he scored a third-round technical knockout over Ronnie Craddock, whom he had also just beaten in the recent Golden Gloves heavyweight final.  Later that year, he participated in the Olympics and turned professional.  His participation in the Club's event is not surprising since at least five of the eleven Louisville men who sponsored him in his early years were Club members.

That was not the only notable event in the Club's ballroom as it was the setting for the "Belmont Ball" scene in the 2010 Disney movie Secretariat on October 9, 2009.

Numerous Club events have long accompanied the annual running of the Kentucky Derby.  Various celebrities and royalty have been guests at the Club for these events, including at its very popular Post Derby Party on the night of the race.

See also
 List of American gentlemen's clubs

References

 Levi Bloom, Histories of Club 1934 & 1940; Pendennis Club membership & miscellaneous records; Louisville Post, 5-21-1891, p. 4; 
 Samuel W. Thomas, The Origins of Louisville's Parks & Parkways, page 140; 
 Courier-Journal articles:  Churchill 6-15-1907 & 4-30-1913; Pendennis 8-10&12-1930; 11-29-1939; Cuneo 7-22-1943; Noyes 10-18-1922; Straub 11-30-1909; Todd 3-20-1892; Clay (Ali) 2-20-1960; Olmsted 5-24-1891; Bain 7-14-1909 & 12-7-1958; building 10-28-1927, 11-29-1927, 12-9-1928 & 12-11, 1928; 
 Albert Stevens Crockett, Old Waldorf Bar Days (1931); 
 George J. Kappeler, Modern American Drinks (1895); 
 Jacques Straub, Straub's Manuel of Mixed Drinks (1913); 
 Tom Bullock, The Ideal Bartender (1917); 
 George Leonard Harter, Bull Cook and Authentic Historical Recipes and Practices (1969), p. 351; 
 Toby Cecchini, "The Secret Signature Cocktail of Louisville:  Bartender Toby Cecchini Investigates the Origins of the Pendennis Club Cocktail," Saveur, Oct. 15, 2015; 
 Remarks of John David Myles to the Pendennis Historical Foundation Luncheon, Dec. 7, 2004; 
 Jo M. Ferguson, "Pendennis Club," Encyclopedia of Louisville, pages 696-97; 
 Sam O. English, Jr., Louisville Squash Racquets History (2000); 
 Huston Horn, "The Eleven Men Behind Cassius Clay," Sports Illustrated, March 11, 1963

External links
Official page

1881 establishments in Kentucky
Cultural infrastructure completed in 1928
Organizations based in Louisville, Kentucky
Culture of Louisville, Kentucky
National Register of Historic Places in Louisville, Kentucky
Gentlemen's clubs in the United States
Clubhouses on the National Register of Historic Places in Kentucky
Local landmarks in Louisville, Kentucky
Organizations established in 1881
Colonial Revival architecture in Kentucky